Let Me Stand Alone is a book containing collected writings, including diaries and letters, of Rachel Corrie, published by W. W. Norton & Company in 2008. Corrie was killed in 2003 by an Israel Defense Forces armored bulldozer while protesting the destruction of a Gaza house which belonged to a Palestinian doctor.

According to W. W. Norton & Company,

How do we find our way in the world? How do our actions affect others? What do we owe the rest of humanity? These are the timeless questions so eloquently posed by Rachel Corrie, a young American activist killed on March 16, 2003, as she tried to block the demolition of a Palestinian family's home in the Gaza Strip.
The "collection of her journal entries opens a window on the maturation of a young woman seeking to make the world a better place."

References

Literature
Rachel Corrie, Let Me Stand Alone, W. W. Norton & Company, 2008,

External links
'I will dance and play basketball and I'll have real stories to tell. I won't just be a sack of words ...' – Rachel Corrie's diaries, The Observer, Sunday 2 March 2008

Rachel Corrie
American memoirs
Human rights in the Gaza Strip
Israeli–Palestinian conflict books
2008 non-fiction books
W. W. Norton & Company books